The 2023 Co-op Canadian Open was held from January 10 to 15 at the Encana Arena in Camrose, Alberta. It was the fourth Grand Slam event and third major of the 2022–23 curling season.

In the women's final, Satsuki Fujisawa and her team from Japan became the first Asian team to win a Grand Slam title (excluding defunct Slams; China's Wang Bingyu had won the 2010 Curlers Corner Autumn Gold Curling Classic, which was considered a Slam at the time.), defeating the Canadian champion Kerri Einarson rink. On the men's side, the home province Brendan Bottcher rink defeated Sweden's Niklas Edin team in the final.

Qualification
Sixteen teams competed in the Canadian Open. They included the seven top-ranked teams on the World Curling Federation's Order of Merit rankings as of December 5, 2022, the seven top teams on the Year-to-Date rankings as of December 5, the Tier 2 winner of the 2022 Tour Challenge, and a sponsor's exemption. The first matches were set per the rankings on December 12, 2022.

Men
Top men's teams as of December 5:
{| class=wikitable
! # !! Order of Merit !! Year-to-Date
|-
! 1
|
 Brad Gushue
|
 Niklas Edin
|-
! 2
|
 Niklas Edin
 Bruce Mouat
|
 Matt Dunstone
|-
! 3
|
 Brendan Bottcher
|
 Brad Gushue
 Yannick Schwaller
|-
! 4
|
 Matt Dunstone
 Kevin Koe
|
 Kevin Koe
 Joël Retornaz
|-
! 5
|
 Joël Retornaz
 Reid Carruthers
|
 Brendan Bottcher
 Korey Dropkin
 Reid Carruthers
 Steffen Walstad
 Ross Whyte
|-
! 6
|
 Yannick Schwaller
 Ross Whyte
 Colton Flasch
|
 Bruce Mouat
 Magnus Ramsfjell
|-
! 7
|
 Korey Dropkin
 John Epping
|
 Wouter Gösgens
|}

Tour Challenge Tier 2 winner:
 Korey Dropkin

Sponsor's exemption:
 Tanner Horgan

Women
Top women's teams as of December 5:
{| class=wikitable
! # !! Order of Merit !! Year-to-Date
|-
! 1
|
 Kerri Einarson
|
 Silvana Tirinzoni
|-
! 2
|
 Anna Hasselborg
|
 Tracy Fleury
|-
! 3
|
 Tracy Fleury
 Silvana Tirinzoni
 Satsuki Fujisawa
|
 Gim Eun-ji
|-
! 4
|
 Kaitlyn Lawes
|
 Kerri Einarson
 Jennifer Jones
|-
! 5
|
 Gim Eun-ji
 Jennifer Jones
 Kim Eun-jung
 Casey Scheidegger
|
 Satsuki Fujisawa
 Kaitlyn Lawes
 Clancy Grandy
 Casey Scheidegger
 Raphaela Keiser
|-
! 6
|
 Isabella Wranå
|
 Abby Ackland
|-
! 7
|
 Raphaela Keiser
 Tabitha Peterson
|
 Anna Hasselborg
 Isabelle Ladouceur
|}

Tour Challenge Tier 2 winner:
 Clancy Grandy
 Stefania Constantini

Sponsor's exemption:
N/A
 Michèle Jäggi

Men

Teams
The teams are listed as follows:

Knockout brackets

Source:

A event

B event

C event

Knockout results

All draw times are listed in Mountain Time (UTC−07:00).

Draw 3
Tuesday, January 10, 3:00 pm

Draw 4
Tuesday, January 10, 6:30 pm

Draw 7
Wednesday, January 11, 4:00 pm

Draw 8
Wednesday, January 11, 8:00 pm

Draw 10
Thursday, January 12, 12:00 pm

Draw 12
Thursday, January 12, 8:00 pm

Draw 13
Friday, January 13, 8:30 am

Draw 14
Friday, January 13, 12:30 pm

Draw 16
Friday, January 13, 8:30 pm

Playoffs

Quarterfinals
Saturday, January 14, 12:00 pm

Semifinals
Saturday, January 14, 8:00 pm

Final
Sunday, January 15, 11:00 am

Women

Teams
The teams are listed as follows:

Knockout brackets

Source:

A event

B event

C event

Knockout results

All draw times are listed in Mountain Time (UTC−07:00).

Draw 1
Tuesday, January 10, 8:00 am

Draw 2
Tuesday, January 10, 11:30 am

Draw 5
Wednesday, January 11, 8:30 am

Draw 6
Wednesday, January 11, 12:00 pm

Draw 9
Thursday, January 12, 8:30 am

Draw 11
Thursday, January 12, 4:00 pm

Draw 13
Friday, January 13, 8:30 am

Draw 15
Friday, January 13, 4:30 pm

Draw 17
Saturday, January 14, 8:30 am

Playoffs

Quarterfinals
Saturday, January 14, 4:00 pm

Semifinals
Saturday, January 14, 8:00 pm

Final
Sunday, January 15, 3:00 pm

Notes

References

External links

January 2023 sports events in Canada
2023 in Canadian curling
Curling in Alberta
2023 in Alberta
Canadian Open of Curling
Sport in Camrose, Alberta